Newman's Law is a 1974 American crime film directed by Richard T. Heffron and starring George Peppard.

Plot
Vince Newman, a no-nonsense cop, decides to investigate on his own when tipped off that colleagues in the police department are involved in a drug ring.

Cast
 George Peppard as Vince Newman
 Roger Robinson as Garry  
 Eugene Roche as Reardon
 Gordon Pinsent as Jack Eastman 
 Abe Vigoda as John Dellanzia
 Louis Zorich as Frank Lo Falcone
 Michael Lerner as Frank Acker
 Victor Campos as Pete Jimenez
 Mel Stewart as Quist
 Jack Murdoch as Beutel
 David Spielberg as Hinney
 Teddy Wilson as Jaycee (as Theodore Wilson)
 Pat Anderson as Sharon
 Regis Cordic as Clement (as Regis J. Cordic)
 Marlene Clark as Edie
 Kip Niven as Assistant Coroner
 Richard Bull as Immigration Man
 Howard Platt as Spink
 Dick Balduzzi as Conrad
 Penelope Gillette as Matron
 Kirk Mee as First Assistant
 Don Hanmer as Real Estate Agent
 Antony Carbone as Policeman Gino
 Jude Farese as Cop #1
 Stack Pierce as Baines
 Jac Emel as Dashiki 
 Don Newsome as Ginger (as Donald Newsome)
 Titos Vandis as Grainie
 Wilbert Gowdy as Black Boy
 Louis J. DiFonzo as Pants
 Dea St. Lamont as Hooker

References

External links

1974 films
1970s crime drama films
American crime drama films
Fictional portrayals of the Los Angeles Police Department
Films about police misconduct
Films directed by Richard T. Heffron
Films scored by Robert Prince
Films set in Los Angeles
American police detective films
Universal Pictures films
1974 drama films
1970s English-language films
1970s American films
English-language drama films